Benjamin Phillips Jr. known professionally as Autumn (stylized as Autumn!), is an American rapper and record producer. He initially started as a producer under the name TrapGodBenji. He is best known for popularizing the pluggnb subgenre alongside fellow artist Summrs.

Discography

Studio albums

Mixtapes

References

External links 
 

Living people
American male rappers
Rappers from Louisiana
1997 births